Liptovský Michal is a village and municipality in Ružomberok District in the Žilina Region of northern Slovakia.

History
In historical records the village was first mentioned in 1331.

Geography
The municipality lies at an altitude of 526 metres and covers an area of 1.595 km². It has a population of about 269 people.

References

External links
https://web.archive.org/web/20071116010355/http://www.statistics.sk/mosmis/eng/run.html

Villages and municipalities in Ružomberok District